Brégnier-Cordon is a commune in the Ain department in eastern France.

Geography
Brégnier-Cordon lies 20 km south of Belley. It is located in a bend of the Rhône on the edge of Savoie (on the southeast) and Isère (on the west). The bridge at Cordon joins the commune to Aoste, in the Isère department. It borders the communes of Groslée-Saint-Benoît, Prémeyzel, Izieu, Murs-et-Gélignieux, Champagneux, Saint-Genix-les-Villages, Aoste and Les Avenières-Veyrins-Thuellin.

The territory of the commune lies principally in the plain of the Rhône at the foot of the Jura mountains. On the north, it is bordered by the Gland.

The Lake of Glandieu is located in the commune near the hamlet of the same name.

Population

Transportation
The commune is on the D19 highway coming from Sault-Brénaz and going to the northwest. This becomes the D992 south of the commune and heads north toward Belley. The D10 passes north of the commune, connecting the D19 to the D992 without following the Rhône.

The closest motorway is the A43, accessed at the Chimilin–Les Abrets exit a few kilometers south of the commune.

Sights
 Château de la Barre
 Ruins of the feudal Château de Cordon 
 Stone bridge over the Rhône
 Memorial to deported Jewish children 
 Dam and hydroelectric power station on the Rhône
 Grotte de Liévrin : prehistoric cave classified as a monument historique in 1913
 Grotte de la Bonne Femme : natural cavity cut into the north flank of Cordon hill, occupied in paleolithic times and a monument historique since 1913
 Cascade de Glandieu : waterfall

See also
Communes of the Ain department

References

Communes of Ain